Bjørn Morisse (7 February 1944 – 27 July 2006) was a Norwegian musician, illustrator and comics creator.

Personal life
Morisse was born in Oslo and was a brother of Tor Morisse. Having spent part of his childhood in the United States, he was educated as illustrator.
Bjorn was married to Aud Berggren - mother of his only son Andre born on April 23, 1966, he divorced Aud Berggren in 1972. He then married Penny Sugg (after their divorce she remarried and got Holtzem as surname) in 1974 until 1982. His son Andre lives and works in New York city.
Bjørn died in Kristiansand in July 2006.

Career
In 1966 Morisse formed the musical duo The Young Norwegians along with Bjørn Falk Nilsen. They performed at the Dolphin Club in Oslo, and made their television debut in 1966. In 1967 they issued their first album,  Things On Our Mind.

His humorous comic strip Glåmrik was published in the newspaper Dagbladet from 1972 to 1975 and subsequently issued as a three-volume album series.

References

1944 births
2006 deaths
20th-century Norwegian male singers
20th-century Norwegian singers
Comics creators from Oslo
Norwegian illustrators